Tambo Colorado is a well-preserved Inca adobe complex near the coast of Peru, also known under the Quechua names Puka Tampu ("red resting place"), Pukallaqta ("red place") or Pukawasi ("red house").

Location 
The site is located just inland from the south coast of Perú in the Pisco River Valley about 40 km along the highway to Ayacucho known as the Via de los Libertadores, close to the town of Pisco. Initial reports from the 2007 Peru earthquake reported no major damage to the site.

A High resolution GPS point was shot at the site datum on 2 Aug 2009 using an L2 GPS (Trimble GeoXH with Zephyr).
The post-processed position is as follows:
Northings: 8484705.386 m (± 0.8 m)
Eastings: 410335.884 m (± 0.8 m)
Altitude (MSL): 484.849 m (±1.8 m)
UTM Zone 18 South, Datum WGS 1984.

History 
The site was most likely built at the end of the 15th century during the reign of the Inca king Pachacuti Inca Yupanqui also known as Pachacutec, after the annexation of the merchant kingdom of Chincha.

Name 
The site owes its name to the abundant use of colors on the walls. Thanks to favorable (very dry) environmental conditions, many walls at Tambo, both internal and external, retain enough residual colored paint to accurately reconstruct what the original wall painting would have been like. Color here was often applied in horizontal strips of red, black, white, and yellow ochre atop stucco, and variation in color would accentuate architectural features such as niches. Trapezoidal niches at Tambo have one or two recesses each, likely used for the placement of important objects. As with all Inca constructions, the overall dimensions of niche construction are standardized across the entire site.

Lay-out 

The site consists of several structures around a large central plaza. The central plaza is shaped like a trapezoid with its largest side being 150 m long. The main structures are grouped together in a northern part and a southern part (Sector Norte and Sector Sur). These structures are known as the Northern palace and the two Southern Palaces, flanked by an Ushnu (raised ceremonial platform) and a building known as the Utilities Structure.

The combination of Chincha and Inca architectural techniques can be seen in the place.

Use 
It is believed to have been used by the Incas as an administrative and control site on the main road from the coast to the highlands.

Museum 
A small on-site museum is located near the entrance of the complex.

External links
Tambo Colorado Digital Media Archive (creative commons-licensed photos, laser scans, panoramas), data from a UC Berkeley/CyArk research partnership

Notes 

Inca
Former populated places in Peru
Archaeological sites in Ica Region
Archaeological sites in Peru
Archaeological museums in Peru
Tourist attractions in Ica Region